Paralimnus is a genus of true bugs belonging to the family Cicadellidae.

The species of this genus are found in Europe and Russia.

Species:
 Paralimnus albipunctatus Mitjaev, 1967 
 Paralimnus angusticeps Zachvatkin, 1953

References

Cicadellidae
Hemiptera genera